Campton and Chicksands is a civil parish in the Central Bedfordshire district, in the ceremonial county of Bedfordshire, England. Its main settlements are Campton and Chicksands. In 2011 it had a population of 1699.

History 
The parish was formed on 1 April 1985 "Campton" and "Chicksands".

References

External links

Civil parishes in Bedfordshire
Central Bedfordshire District